The Taça Competência was a tournament organized by Associação Paulista de Esportes Atléticos (APEA), that aimed to carry out the confrontation between the Capital and the Countryside champions, since at the time, logistical impossibilities did not allow teams from the interior of the state to compete in the same championship as the capital clubs.

List of Champions 

The difference in levels was absolute, and never has a team from the countryside managed to win the Taça Competência. In 2021, the Federação Paulista de Futebol considered the countryside division of APEA to be equivalent to the second tier of football in São Paulo.

Titles by club

See also

Taça Campeonato Estadual FPF

References  

Recurring sporting events established in 1918
Recurring sporting events disestablished in 1932
Recurring events disestablished in 1932
Defunct football competitions in Brazil